The Republic of Poland Ambassador to Russia is the leader of the Poland delegation to Russia.

As with all Poland Ambassadors, the ambassador to Russia is nominated by the President of Poland and confirmed by the Parliamentary Commission of the Foreign Affairs. The ambassador serves at the pleasure of the president, and enjoys full diplomatic immunity. 

Poland Embassy in Russia is located in Moscow. In addition there are Consulates General located in Irkutsk, Kaliningrad and Saint Petersburg. There is also Consular Agency in Smolensk, which is responsible for looking after the Katyn massacre and Smolensk air disaster memorials.

History 
Poland and Russia had exchanged diplomatic missions for centuries. The first ambassador in the modern meaning of this word, from Poland to Russia, was Antoni Augustyn Deboli, in late 18th century. After the period of partitions of Poland, in 1918, relations were established between the Second Polish Republic and Soviet Union. After Soviet invasion of Poland in 1939 those relations were broken, to be briefly reestablished in 1941 after the German invasion of the Soviet Union, when the Soviet Union and Polish government in exile agreed to cooperate against their common enemy, Nazi Germany. Those relations were broken in 1943 after discovery of the Katyn massacre. From that point onward, Soviet Union created its own puppet Polish government, which had its "ambassadors" in the Soviet Union. In 1989 the People's Republic of Poland was transformed into the modern Poland; in 1991, Soviet Union was transformed into modern Russia.

List of ambassadors of Poland to Russia

Polish–Lithuanian Commonwealth 
 1556 Stefan Zbaraski
 1571 Michał Haraburda
 1686 Krzysztof Grzymułtowski
 1702 Krzysztof Białłozor
 1704 Tomasz Działyński
 1707–1709 Józef Tausz
 1712 Marcin Wołłowicz i Michał Puzyna
 1717–1718 Franciszek Poniński
 1718 Lesiowski
 1719–1720 Stanisław Chomętowski
 1735 Ignacy Zawisza
 1739–1743 Ignacy Ogiński
 1762 Alojzy Fryderyk von Brühl
 1763 Jan Jędrzej Borch
 1764 Gerwazy Ludwik Oskierka
 1764–1765 Franciszek Rzewuski
 1765–1766 Jakub Psarski
 1766–1767 Franciszek Rzewuski
 1767–1772 Jakub Psarski (rezydent)
 1771 Franciszek Ksawery Branicki
 1767–1792 Antoni Augustyn Deboli (first ambassador in the modern meaning of this word)

Second Polish Republic 
Note: Second Republic was created in 1918. Its ambassadors were sent to the newly created successor state of Russia, the Soviet Union.
 1917–1918 Aleksander Lednicki (of the Regency Council)
 1918–1919 Ludwik Darowski (j.w.)
 1919–1920 Józef Targowski (Minister Pełnomocny i Wysoki Komisarz RP na Syberię)
 1921 Tytus Filipowicz (Chargé d'Affaires)
 1921–1923 Roman Knoll (Poseł)
 1923–1924 Kazimierz Wyszyński (Chargé d'Affaires a.i.)
 1924 Ludwik Darowski
 1924–1925 Kazimierz Wyszyński (Chargé d'Affaires a.i.)
 1925–1926 Stanisław Kętrzyński
 1926–1932 Stanisław Patek
 1932–1933 Henryk Sokolnicki (Chargé d'Affaires a.i.)
 1933–1934 Juliusz Łukasiewicz
 1934–1936 Juliusz Łukasiewicz (Ambasador)
 1936–1939 Wacław Grzybowski

Polish government-in-exile 
Note: Legal successor of the Second Polish Republic.
 1941 Józef Retinger (Chargé d'Affaires)
 1941–1942 Stanisław Kot
 1942 Henryk Sokolnicki (Chargé d'Affaires a.i.)
 1942–1943 Tadeusz Romer

People's Republic of Poland 
Note: Officially, People's Republic of Poland is the name used since 1952. Unofficially, this name is used for all Polish communist governments since 1944.
 1944 Stefan Jędrychowski
 1945 Zygmunt Modzelewski
 1945–1946 Henryk Raabe
 1947–1950 Marian Naszkowski
 1953–1957 Wacław Lewikowski
 1957–1959 Tadeusz Gede
 1959–1963 Bolesław Jaszczuk
 1963–1964 Edmund Pszczółkowski
 1968–1971 Jan Ptasiński
 1971 Zenon Nowak
 1978–1982 Kazimierz Olszewski
 1982–1985 Stanisław Kociołek
 1985–1989 Włodzimierz Natorf

Third Polish Republic 
Note: modern Poland.
 1989–1996 Stanisław Ciosek
 1996–2002 Andrzej Załucki
 2002–2005 Stefan Meller
 2005–2006 Wiktor Ross (chargé d'affaires a.i.)
 2006–2010 Jerzy Bahr
 2010–2014 Wojciech Zajączkowski
 2014–2016 Katarzyna Pełczyńska-Nałęcz
2016–2020 Włodzimierz Marciniak
since 2021 – Krzysztof Krajewski

See also
Ambassadors and envoys from Russia to Poland (1763–1794)
Ambassadors and envoys from the Soviet Union to Poland
Poland–Russia relations

References

 
Poland
Russia